Untraded shares or  refer to the shares of listed companies that are not allowed to be released by some of the investors within the lockup period. Since the split-share structure reform was launched by the State Council of the People's Republic of China in 2005, some of the investors were not allowed to release their shares of the listed state-owned enterprises until the lockup period expired, so as to sustain the overall stock market. After the lockup period expires, the investors can choose to sell the shares and this may cause negative impacts to stock market from the selling pressure.

See also
Economy of China

References

Stock market
Finance in China